Alison Killing is a British architect and urban designer. In 2010, she founded a studio for design and research in the field of architecture named Killing Architects. She is a TED Fellow as well.

Early life
She was born in Newcastle upon Tyne, England and currently lives in Rotterdam, the Netherlands.

She studied architecture at King's College, Cambridge and Oxford Brookes.

Pulitzer Prize
Killing was part of the team that produced a series of innovative articles that used satellite images, 3D architectural models, and in-person interviews to expose China’s vast infrastructure for detaining hundreds of thousands of Muslims in its Xinjiang region and won the 2021 Pulitzer Prize for International Reporting.

References

External links
 Killing Architects (Official website)

Year of birth missing (living people)
Living people
British women architects
Architects from Northumberland
Pulitzer Prize for International Reporting winners
21st-century British architects